Ivana Baquero Macías (born 11 June 1994) is a Spanish actress. At the age of 11, she was chosen to star as Ofelia in Pan's Labyrinth, for which she won critical acclaim and the Goya Award for Best New Actress. In 2015, she was cast as Eretria in the television series The Shannara Chronicles.

Early life
Baquero was born in Barcelona, Spain, the daughter of Iván Baquero and Julía Macías. She attended the American School of Barcelona, where she learned to speak fluent English, Spanish and Catalan. She graduated in 2012.

Career

Baquero started acting professionally at the age of eight, playing a few small roles in a number of films, the most notable of which is Fragile, in which she played a minor role. She was in a number of other films including Romasanta and Rottweiler. She has also appeared on Spanish television on a few occasions.

From about 1,000 young actresses, Baquero was picked to play the role of Ofelia in Pan's Labyrinth in 2006. The role of Ofelia was originally intended for a girl of the age of 8, but the script was altered to accommodate Baquero, who was 11 at the time. Afterward, she worked in various projects while still attending school.

In 2009, she played the title role in John Connolly's horror film, The New Daughter, marking her first American role. In 2016, Baquero portrayed Eretria in The Shannara Chronicles, an MTV television adaptation of the Shannara novel series by Terry Brooks; its second season premiered in 2017. From 2018 to 2020, Ivana played the role of Eva Villanueva in the Netflix show High Seas.

Filmography

Awards and nominations
 2007: XXI Goya Award for Best Young Actress.
 2007: Saturn Award for Best Performance by a Younger Actor.
 2007: Premio de la Unión de Actores for Best Young Actress.
 2007: Turia Award for Best Supporting Role (Female).
 2007: Premio ACE for Best Performance by a Younger Actor.
 2007: Imagen Awards for Best Performance by a Younger Actor.
 2017: Sophia Awards for Best Actress. 
 2017: Silver Biznaga for Best Actress.

References

External links

 
 

1994 births
Living people
21st-century Spanish actresses
Actresses from Barcelona
Goya Award winners
Spanish child actresses
Spanish film actresses
Spanish television actresses